Alomiella is a genus of flowering plants in the family Asteraceae, described as a genus in 1972.

The genus is endemic to the State of Mato Grosso in Brazil.

 Species
 Alomiella hatschbachii R.M.King & H.Rob. - Mato Grosso
 Alomiella regnellii (Malme) R.M.King & H.Rob.  - Mato Grosso

References

Asteraceae genera
Eupatorieae
Endemic flora of Brazil